The 2020 American Athletic Conference women's basketball tournament was a postseason tournament that was held March 6–9, 2020, in the Mohegan Sun Arena in Uncasville, Connecticut. UConn won the tournament, their seventh consecutively, and earned an automatic bid to the 2020 NCAA Division I women's basketball tournament.

Seeds
All the teams in the American Athletic Conference will qualify for the tournament. Teams are seeded based on conference record, and then a tiebreaker system will be used. Teams seeded 5–12 play in the opening round, and teams seeded 1–4 received a bye to the quarterfinals.

Schedule
All tournament games are nationally televised on an ESPN network:

Bracket

Note: * denotes overtime

References

American Athletic Conference women's basketball tournament
2019–20 American Athletic Conference women's basketball season
2020 in sports in Connecticut
College basketball tournaments in Connecticut
Sports competitions in Uncasville, Connecticut
Women's sports in Connecticut